1181 Lilith is a metallic asteroid from the middle region of the asteroid belt, approximately  in diameter. It was discovered on 11 February 1927, by Russian–French astronomer Benjamin Jekhowsky at Algiers Observatory in Algeria, Northern Africa, and named after French composer Lili Boulanger.

Classification and orbit 

Lilith is a non-family asteroid of the main belt's background population when applying the hierarchical clustering method to its proper orbital elements. It orbits the Sun in the middle asteroid belt at a distance of 2.1–3.2 AU once every 4 years and 4 months (1,587 days). Its orbit has an eccentricity of 0.20 and an inclination of 6° with respect to the ecliptic.

Naming 

This minor planet was named by the discoverer for French composer Marie-Juliette Olga Lili Boulanger (1893–1918), younger sister of the noted conductor and composer, Nadia Boulanger. Her byname "Lili" originates from Lilith, Adam's first wife in Jewish mythology.

Physical characteristics 

Lilith is an X-type asteroid in the Bus–Binzel SMASS taxonomy. It has also been classified as a P-type asteroid by NASA's space-based Wide-field Infrared Survey Explorer (WISE).

Rotation period 

In February 2014, a rotational lightcurve of Lilith was obtained by Italian astronomer Andrea Ferrero at the Bigmuskie Observatory  in Mombercelli, Italy. The photometric observations rendered a period of  hours with a brightness amplitude of 0.11 in magnitude.

Diameter and albedo 

References

External links 
 Asteroid Lightcurve Database (LCDB), query form (info )
 Dictionary of Minor Planet Names, Google books
 Asteroids and comets rotation curves, CdR – Observatoire de Genève, Raoul Behrend
 Discovery Circumstances: Numbered Minor Planets (1)-(5000) – Minor Planet Center
 
 

001181
Discoveries by Benjamin Jekhowsky
Named minor planets
001181
19270211